Joseph McDonnell (14 September 1951 – 8 July 1981) was a volunteer in the Provisional Irish Republican Army (IRA) who died during the 1981 Irish hunger strike.

Early life
McDonnell was born on Slate Street in the lower Falls Road of Belfast as one of 10 children. He attended a nearby Roman Catholic school. He married Goretti in 1970, and moved into her sister's house in Lenadoon. Their house was attacked on numerous occasions.

IRA activity

McDonnell was arrested in Operation Demetrius, and along with Gerry Adams and others was interned on the prison ship HMS Maidstone. He was later moved to HM Prison Maze for several months. Upon release, he joined the Provisional IRA Belfast Brigade. He met Bobby Sands during the preparation for a firebomb attack on the Balmoral Furnishing Company's premises in Dunmurry. During the ensuing shoot-out between the IRA and the Royal Ulster Constabulary (RUC) and British Army, both men, along with Séamus Finucane and Seán Lavery, were arrested. McDonnell and the others were sentenced to 14 years in prison for possession of a firearm. None of the men recognized nor accepted the jurisdiction of the court.

Hunger strike
McDonnell agreed with the goals of the Irish hunger strike, namely: the right not to wear a prison uniform; the right not to do prison work; the right of free association with other prisoners; the right to organise their own educational and recreational facilities and the right to one visit, one letter and one parcel per week.

Although McDonnell was not involved in the first (1980) hunger strike, he joined Bobby Sands and the others in the second (1981) hunger strike. During the strike he fought the general election in the Republic of Ireland, and only narrowly missed election in the Sligo–Leitrim constituency. He went 61 days without food before dying on 8 July 1981. He has two children. His wife Goretti took an active part in the campaign in support of the hunger strikers.

McDonnell was buried in the grave next to Bobby Sands at Milltown Cemetery. John Joe McGirl, McDonnell's election agent in Sligo–Leitrim, gave the oration at his funeral. Quoting Patrick Pearse, he stated: "He may seem the fool who has given his all, by the wise men of the world; but it was the apparent fools who changed the course of Irish history".

Allegations
In March 2006, former prisoner Richard O'Rawe alleged that three days before McDonnell's death the British government made a firm offer to the prison leadership substantive enough to end the protest. O'Rawe alleges that while the leadership inside the prison were prepared to go for the deal and end the protest to save the lives of McDonnell and the others who died after him, the leadership outside told them to continue.

The IRA commander inside Long Kesh at the time, Brendan McFarlane (known as "Bik"), has publicly disputed this version of events. Only one other prisoner on the prison wing O'Rawe and McFarlane were on, Anthony McIntyre, has backed up O'Rawe's version of events in relation to the 1981 hunger strike.

Commemoration
Upon his death, McDonnell was martyred alongside the other hunger strikers and remains a well-known figure in the movement today, even with his death.

McDonnell is commemorated on the Irish Martyrs Memorial at Waverley Cemetery in Sydney, Australia.

Joe McDonnell is also commemorated in the Wolfe Tones song, "Joe McDonnell". His family is also recognized in the Irish Brigade's "A Father's Blessing", and is one of the 10 hunger strikers mentioned in "The Roll of Honour".

References

External links
General Election: 11 June 1981 Sligo/Leitrim
Ireland's OWN: The Hungerstrikes – Joe McDonnell
Lyrics to Joe McDonnell, the song

 Stailc 81 Hunger Strike Commemoration Committee 

1951 births
1981 deaths
Irish republicans interned without trial
Paramilitaries from Belfast
People who died on the 1981 Irish hunger strike
Provisional Irish Republican Army members
Republicans imprisoned during the Northern Ireland conflict